Clavemeopedus aureosignatus is a species of beetle in the family Cerambycidae, and the only species in the genus Clavemeopedus. It was described by Breuning in 1969.

References

Acanthocinini
Beetles described in 1969
Monotypic Cerambycidae genera
Taxa named by Stephan von Breuning (entomologist)